Gera can be a surname. 

The name Gera is a gender-neutral name of Hebrew origin that means Pilgrimage.

Notable people with the surname include:

 Imre Géra (born 1947), Hungarian cyclist
 Marina Gera (born 1984), Hungarian actress
 Ralucca Gera, American mathematician
 Rohena Gera (born 1973), Indian director, screenwriter, and producer
 Zoltán Gera (born 1979), Hungarian footballer

See also
 Pera (surname)

Indian surnames
Surnames of Indian origin
Punjabi-language surnames
Hindu surnames
Khatri clans
Khatri surnames